Gullick is a surname, and may refer to:

 Donald Gullick (1924 – 2000), a Welsh rugby footballer
 J. M. Gullick (1916 – 2012), a British orientalist 
 Luke Gullick (born 1987), an English footballer
 William Gullick (1858 – 1922), an Australian printer and graphic artist

See also
 Gulick
 Jülich Gullick is a Dutch spelling of Jülich.